The following is a timeline of the history of the city of Salvador, Bahia state, Brazil.

Early history

1502 - Amerigo Vespucci names the bay in honour to his hometown parish church "San Salvatore di Ognissanti" (San Salvador de Todos os Santos) in Florence
 1549 - Brazilian capital established at Bahia by Tomé de Sousa.
 1551 - Catholic Diocese of São Salvador da Bahia de Todos os Santos established.
 1624 - Capture of Salvador da Bahia by the Dutch
 1625 - Recapture of Salvador da Bahia by Spanish-Portuguese forces.
 1635 - Third Order of St. Francis active.
 1636 - Church of the Third Order of Saint Francis established.
 1638 - Siege of Salvador da Bahia
 1672 - Cathedral of Salvador consecrated
 1674 - Mint established.
 1676 - Salvador becomes "metropolitan see of the colony's archbishopric."
 1704 - Church of the Third Order of Our Lady of the Rosary construction begins.
 1711 - Maneta Revolt, two uprisings (Oct. 17 and Dec. 2) by military and public officials against local taxation
 1723
 São Francisco Church built.
 Third Order of St. Dominic active.
 1724 -  founded.
 1754 - Church of Nosso Senhor do Bonfim consecrated.
 1759 - 
 founded.
- December: Expulsion of the Jesuits from Bahia
 1763 - Brazilian capital relocated from Salvador to Rio de Janeiro.
 1765 - Basilica of the Immaculate Conception (church) consecrated.

19th century
 1819 - Yellow fever outbreak.
 1822 - 2 March: Siege of Salvador da Bahia begins.
 1823 - 2 July: Siege of Salvador da Bahia ends.
 1834 -  (bank) established.
 1835
Malê revolt, a slave rebellion
Dois de Julho Society founded.
 1836 - Campo Santo Cemetery established.
 1857 - Revolution of the Ganhadores, a labor strike led by slaves and freedmen
 1858 - Diário da Bahia, a newspaper, begins publication.
 1860 -  begins operating.
 1872 - Population: 129,109.
 1873 - Elevador Lacerda begins operating.
 1882 - Baptist congregation founded.
 1890
  established.
 Population: 174,412.
 1891 - Empório Industrial do Norte begins operating.
 1894 -  founded.
 1899 - Esporte Clube Vitória (football team) formed.
 1900 - Population: 205,813.

20th century

 1910 - Cine Teatro Jandaia opens.
 1912 - A Tarde newspaper begins publication.
 1916 - Avenida Sete de Setembro opens.
 1918 - Bahia Museum of Art established.
 1927 - American School established.
 1930 -  headquartered in city.
 1931 - Esporte Clube Bahia, a football club, formed.
 1933 - Old Cathedral of Salvador demolished.
 1942 -  (air force base) established.
 1950 - Population: 274,910 city; 389,422 metro.
 1951 - Estádio Fonte Nova opens.
 1958 -  and  established.
 1959 - Obras Sociais Irmã Dulce (charity) and Federal University of Bahia's  founded.
 1960 - Population: 393,207 city.
 1961 - Catholic University of Salvador established.
 1962 - Sister city relationship established with Los Angeles, USA.
 1964 - Vila Velha Theater established.
 1970 - Population: 998,258 city; 1,005,216 urban agglomeration.
 1972 - Business School of Bahia established.
 1973 -  established.
 1974
  inaugurated.
 Ilê Aiyê musical group formed.
 1975 -  shopping center in business.
 1979 - Olodum cultural organization founded.
 1983 - 4 November: 1983 Copa América football tournament held.
 1985 - Historic Center of Salvador designated a UNESCO World Heritage Site.
 1987 -  in business.
 1991 - Population: 2,072,058.
 1993 - Population: 2,174,072 (estimate).
 1997 - Salvador Metro construction begins.

21st century
 2006 - Museu da Gastronomia Bahiana (food museum) opens.
 2007
 25 November: Fonte Nova stadium collapses.
 22 May: Salvador Shopping, a mall, opens.
 2008 - Espaco Unibanco de Cinema Glauber Rocha opens.
 2010
 Salvador Norte Shopping, a mall, opens.
 Population: 2,675,656.
 2012 - October:  held.
 2013
 Itaipava Arena Fonte Nova opens.
 ACM Neto becomes mayor.
 2014 - Salvador Metro begins operation.
 2016 - 2 October:  held.

See also
 
 List of mayors of Salvador, Bahia
 
 , including Salvador

References

This article incorporates information from the Portuguese Wikipedia.

Bibliography

in English

in Portuguese

External links

 
 Items related to Salvador, various dates (via Digital Public Library of America)

salvador